Aleksey Belyayev (born 20 February 1985) is a Kazakhstani speed skater. He competed in the men's 1500 metres event at the 2006 Winter Olympics.

References

1985 births
Living people
Kazakhstani male speed skaters
Olympic speed skaters of Kazakhstan
Speed skaters at the 2006 Winter Olympics
People from Pavlodar
Speed skaters at the 2007 Asian Winter Games
21st-century Kazakhstani people